Human Resources is an American adult animated sitcom that serves as a spin-off and subseries to Big Mouth, centering around the workplace of the Hormone Monsters depicted in the series. Created by Kelly Galuska, Nick Kroll, Andrew Goldberg, Mark Levin, and Jennifer Flackett for Netflix, the spin-off series was announced in October 2019. It premiered on March 18, 2022, and stars Aidy Bryant, Randall Park, and Keke Palmer. The series has received positive reviews, and was renewed for a second season in April 2022.

Premise
A workplace comedy set in the world of the monsters from Big Mouth, in which the monsters are assigned to a group of human adults as their representation of feelings.

Cast and characters

Main
 Aidy Bryant as Emmy Fairfax, a female Lovebug that gets assigned to Becca after Sonya was fired from her position.
 Randall Park as Peter "Pete" Doheny, a Logic Rock that represents logic within humans.
 Keke Palmer as Rochelle Hillhurst, a hate-worm turned Lovebug and Emmy's best friend, who is assigned to Doug. Her client in Big Mouth was Missy Foreman-Greenwald.
 David Thewlis as Lionel St. Swithens, a Shame Wizard who haunts children through puberty, stoking and representing their deepest shame.
 Brandon Kyle Goodman as Walter Las Palmas, a male Lovebug that formed a close bond with Yara throughout her life. He later becomes her granddaughter, Natalie's Lovebug, after Yara passes away. His client in Big Mouth was Nick Birch.
 Maya Rudolph as Constance "Connie" LaCienega, a Hormone Monstress who helps adolescent females go through puberty. Her clients in Big Mouth were Jessi Glaser and briefly, despite being male, Nick Birch.
 Nick Kroll as:
 Maurice "Maury" Beverley, a raspy-voiced Hormone Monster that helps adolescent males go through puberty. His clients in Big Mouth were Duke Ellington, Andrew Glouberman, and Matthew Macdell.
 Rick, an elderly disfigured, but experienced Hormone Monster that helps people through words of enthusiasm. His clients in Big Mouth were Coach Steve and Nick Birch.
 Todd, a zombie who works as an electrician at Human Resources.
 Kroll also voices the priest who marries Doug and his fiancée, and Cocky Balls-Boa, one of Maury's dicks modeled after Rocky Balboa.

Recurring
 
 Pamela Adlon as Sonya Poinsettia, a former Lovebug turned bartender who was fired for having come into contact with Claudia, outside of her assigned human, Becca. Her client in Big Mouth was Jessi Glaser.
 Maria Bamford as:
 Tito Taylor Thomas the Anxiety Mosquito, a female Mosquito that represents anxiety in humans.
 Kitty Dukakis the Depression Kitty, an anthropomorphic purple cat employed in the Department of Puberty's Depression Ward.
 Ali Wong as Becca Lee, an Asian-American lawyer who becomes a first-time mother, to which the monsters are assigned.
 Mike Birbiglia as Barry, Becca's husband.
 Bobby Cannavale as Gavin Reeves, an impulsive, intense Hormone Monster who takes his job seriously to Maury's annoyance. He is later killed off in the season finale, "Shitstorm". His client in Big Mouth was briefly Natalie prior to her transition.
 John Gemberling as Tyler Pico, an immature teenage Hormone Monster that was fired from his position for working with Lionel in the second season of Big Mouth. He previously worked as Gavin's assistant, who he gets constantly harassed and abused for his amusement, and serves as Barry's own Hormone Monster.
 Hugh Jackman as Dante, an addiction angel who starts the series involved with Emmy but later dates Rochelle.
 Rosie Perez as Petra the Ambition Gremlin, a Gremlin that represents human ambitions.
 Thandiwe Newton as Mona, a British-accented Hormone Monstress that is a chaotic influence on adolescent females. She is often seen holding a lighter in her hand. Her client in Big Mouth was Missy Foreman-Greenwald.
 Harvey Guillén as José, an anthropomorphic Spider who is the Receptionist of Human Resources.
 Tim Robinson as Doug Fredrick, an arrogant newlywed man who is a massive fan of the Phoenix Suns.
 Ashley London as Donna Fredrick, Doug's loving newlywed wife.
 Chris O'Dowd as Flanny O'Lympic, Barry's Lovebug who speaks in an Irish accent.
 Sabrina Jalees as Nadja El-Khoury, a Lebanese-American high school student who gets accepted to the University of California, Berkeley while in a personal conflict with her girlfriend after she got accepted to Rutgers University.
 Josie Totah as Natalie El-Khoury, a transgender teenager who debuted in the fourth season of Big Mouth. In Human Resources, she is revealed to be Nadja's younger sister.
 Nidah Barber-Raymond as Yara El-Khoury, Natalie's and Nadja's ailing paternal grandmother, Amir's mother, and Walter's client that was close to him.
 Ahmed Mawas as Amir El-Khoury, Natalie's and Nadja's father and Yara's son.
 Ulka Simone Mohanty as Nabilah El-Khoury, Natalie's and Nadja's mother.
 Gil Ozeri as Gil, a Hormone Monster and Joe's best friend.
 Joe Wengert as Joe, a Hormone Monster and Gil's best friend.

Guest stars
 
 Helen Mirren as Rita St. Swithens, a renowned Shame Wizard and Lionel's mother.
 Lupita Nyong'o as Asha, a Shame Wizard that Lionel has a one-night stand with.
 Jemaine Clement as Simon Sex, a sensitive, shroom-taking Hormone Monster and a friend of Maury.
 Janelle Monáe as Claudia, Becca's doula who once fell in love with Sonya.
 John Mulaney as Andrew Glouberman, a Jewish-American teenage boy and Maury's client who spends much of his time furtively masturbating.
 Henry Winkler as Keith from Grief, an anthropomorphic sweater from the Grief department.
 Ariana DeBose as Danielle, Nadia's girlfriend who gets accepted to Rutgers University which leads her into a personal conflict.
 James III as Cat Stevens, Barry's male Depression Kitty who is seen wearing headphones on his neck.
 Kayvan Novak as Arsalan, a Shame Wizard, and Asha's husband.
 James Adomian as the Need Demon, a demon that manifests Becca's baby.
 Casey Wilson as Empathy Mulholland, an anthropomorphic Owl who represents empathy and the Hormone Monsters sex counselor.

Episodes

Production

On October 3, 2019, Netflix announced a straight-to-series order for a spin-off series titled Human Resources, set within the show's universe. Kroll, Goldberg, Levin, Flackett, Nate Funaro, and Kelly Galuska were set to executive produce. On June 14, 2021, more details of the series were announced, including casting. Nick Kroll, Maya Rudolph, and David Thewlis reprised their roles for the spin-off as Maurice the Hormone Monster, Connie the Hormone Monstress, and the Shame Wizard, with additional cast members Brandon Kyle Goodman, Keke Palmer, Aidy Bryant, and Randall Park joining the series. On October 15, 2021, it was announced that Pamela Adlon has joined the spin-off, reprising her role as Sonya the Lovebug, and Goodman's and Palmer's roles were revealed. On January 12, 2022, it was reported that Rosie Perez, Jemaine Clement, Thandiwe Newton, Bobby Cannavale, Henry Winkler, and Maria Bamford were cast in the series, with Cannavale, Bamford, Newton and Clement reprising their roles from Big Mouth. The series was released on March 18, 2022.

On March 1, 2022, an official trailer was released with Helen Mirren, Lupita Nyong'o, Chris O'Dowd, Harvey Guillén, Janelle Monáe, Mike Birbiglia, Tim Robinson, Hugh Jackman and Ali Wong joining the spin-off. Jackman previously guest-starred in Big Mouth voicing a fictional version of himself, being depicted as one of Maury's dicks and Wong has voiced recurring character Ali since the third season. Later that same month, Kroll revealed the remainder of the cast for the series through social media. On April 18, 2022, Netflix renewed the series for a second season.

Reception
On review aggregator website Rotten Tomatoes, season one holds a 90% approval rating based on 20 critic reviews, with an average rating of 7.4/10. The website's critics consensus reads, "The Hormone Monsters are pushing paper and phalluses in Human Resources, a workplace spinoff of Big Mouth that's just as raunchy and sweet." On Metacritic, the series has a score of 72 out of 100, based on 6 critic reviews, indicating "generally favorable reviews".

Elly Belle of The A.V. Club gave the series a B and said, "Familiarity with Big Mouth may bring in viewers, but Human Resources distinctive humor and commentary on humanity will keep them watching."

References

External links
 
 

2020s American adult animated television series
2020s American LGBT-related animated television series
2020s American LGBT-related comedy television series
2020s American sex comedy television series
2020s American sitcoms
2020s American workplace comedy television series
2022 American television series debuts
American adult animated comedy television series
American adult animated television spin-offs
American animated sitcoms
American flash adult animated television series
Animated adult television sitcoms
Animated television series by Netflix
English-language Netflix original programming
Animated television series about monsters
Works about puberty